Jan Křivohlávek (born August 20, 1991) is a Czech professional ice hockey player who currently plays with the Carolina Thunderbirds of the Federal Prospects Hockey League (FPHL).

Křivohlávek previously played in the Czech Extraliga for HC Kometa Brno, between 2010 and 2014. in the Czech Extraliga.

References

External links

1991 births
Living people
Brest Albatros Hockey players
Czech ice hockey forwards
HC Havířov players
BK Havlíčkův Brod players
SK Horácká Slavia Třebíč players
HC Kometa Brno players
People from Havířov
Sportspeople from the Moravian-Silesian Region
Czech expatriate ice hockey people
Czech expatriate sportspeople in France
Expatriate ice hockey players in France